28th New York Film Critics Circle Awards
No Awards because of newspaper strike which started December 8, 1962 
The 28th New York Film Critics Circle Awards, cancelled due to the 114-day 1962 New York City newspaper strike, which started on December 8, 1962.

References

External links
1962 Awards

1962
New York Film Critics Circle Awards, 1962
New York Film Critics Circle Awards
New York Film Critics Circle Awards
New York Film Critics Circle Awards
New York Film Critics Circle Awards
Cancelled film events